Rayne may refer to:

 Rayne (surname)
 Rayne, Essex, England, UK
 Rayne railway station
 Rayne, Aberdeenshire, location of the parish church held by the Archdeacon of Aberdeen in Scotland, UK
 Rayne, Louisiana, U.S.
 Rayne High School
 Rayne Township, Indiana County, Pennsylvania, U.S.
 Rayne (BloodRayne), the protagonist of BloodRayne
 Rayne (shoe company), British manufacturer and retailer of shoes
 Rayne Johnson, country music singer
 Rayne (footballer) (born 1997), Brazilian footballer

See also
Tha' Rayne, musical group
The Pilgrims of Rayne, the eighth installment on The Pendragon Adventure
 Rain (disambiguation)
 Raine (disambiguation)
 Raein, an Italian screamo band
 RAINN, Rape, Abuse and Incest National Network
 Rane (disambiguation)
 Rein (disambiguation)
 Reine, Norway
 Reign (disambiguation)
 Raines (surname)
 Rainey, a surname
 Rayner (disambiguation)